The Bloch Brothers Tobacco Company (formerly the Helme Tobacco Company) of Wheeling, West Virginia was a tobacco company founded by brothers Aaron and Samuel Bloch in 1879. It was best known for its Mail Pouch chewing tobacco. Mail Pouch was a popular chew advertised on over 20,000 barns, most of which were located in the rural Ohio River Valley. Each barn had an end or side painted with the familiar Mail Pouch lettering and advertising, "Treat yourself to the best."

The brothers began manufacturing cigars in 1879 as a side-line to Samuel Bloch's wholesale grocery business. It was discovered that the left-over cigar clippings could be flavored and packaged in a paper bag, and then sold. Mail Pouch chewing tobacco is still produced by Swisher International Group.

See also
George Washington Helme
Helme Snuff Mill Historic District
List of historic sites in Ohio County, West Virginia
Mail Pouch Tobacco Barn

References

Companies based in Wheeling, West Virginia
Landmarks in West Virginia
Defunct manufacturing companies based in West Virginia
Tobacco buildings in the United States